Michael Creedon (born 1960) is an Irish retired Gaelic footballer who played as a goalkeeper for the Cork senior team.

Creedon joined the panel during the 1981 championship and was a regular member of the starting fifteen for three seasons until his retirement after the 1984 championship. During that time he won one Munster medal.

At club level Creedon played with Naomh Abán.

References

1960 births
Living people
Naomh Abán Gaelic footballers
Cork inter-county Gaelic footballers